This is a list of notable frozen yogurt companies. Frozen yogurt is a frozen dessert made with yogurt and sometimes other dairy products including non-dairy products. It varies from slightly to much more tart than ice cream, as well as being lower in fat (due to the use of milk instead of cream). It is different from ice milk (later termed low-fat or light ice cream) and conventional soft serve. Unlike yogurt, frozen yogurt is not regulated by the U.S. Food and Drug Administration (FDA), but is regulated by some U.S. states. Frozen yogurt may or may not contain live and active bacteria cultures.

Frozen yogurt companies

 Chocolate Shoppe Ice Cream Company  
 Frosty Boy
 Golden Spoon
 Handel's Homemade Ice Cream & Yogurt 
 I Can't Believe It's Yogurt!
 Llaollao 
 Menchie's Frozen Yogurt
 Orange Leaf Frozen Yogurt
 Pinkberry
 Red Mango
 Sour Sally
 Sweet Frog 
 The Bigg Chill
 TCBY
 Tutti Frutti Frozen Yogurt 
 Wakaberry
 Yogen Früz
 Yogoberry 
 Yogurt Mountain
 Yogurtland
 Yumilicious

References

Food industry-related lists